Include Me Out is a studio album released in 2013 by Martin Gordon on Radiant Future Records.

Track listing
 "Gotta Go Green"
 "If English Is Good Enough For Jesus"
 "Stanley Green"
 "No Greater Dictator"
 "Nobody Went to the Moon"
 "Call Me Anne"
 "Still Not Lovin'"
 "User Generated"
 "Include Me Out"	
 "Bang Your Head"	
 "Girls From the Country"
 "Why Wake Up"

Personnel
 Martin Gordon/bass guitar, double bass, keyboards, production
 Pelle Almgren/vocals
 Ralf Leeman/guitar, ukulele
 Enrico Antico/guitar
 Romain Vicente/drums

References

External Links 

 Album page at Martin Gordon site

Martin Gordon albums
2013 albums
Radiant Future albums
Albums produced by Martin Gordon